Caá Catí or Nuestra Señora del Rosario de Caá Catí is a town in Corrientes Province, Argentina. It is the head town of the General Paz Department.

The town was founded in 1707.

From 1912 until 1927 Caá Catí had a railway station on the Ferrocarril Económico Correntino narrow gauge railway between Corrientes and Mburucuyá

External links

 Caá Catí website

Populated places in Corrientes Province
Populated places established in 1707
1707 establishments in the Spanish Empire